Cegedel S.A. (until 17 May 1997 the Compagnie Grand-Ducale d'Électricité du Luxembourg), was a Luxembourg company that distributed electricity.  It operated under a concession written into the law under which it was formed, and distributed 70% of the electricity used in the country, amounting to 6,616 GWh.

The Government of Luxembourg owned one-third of the company, which made it the largest single shareholder, followed by the 30.4% stake held by Luxempart-Energie, with smaller stakes held by SNCI (12%) and Electrabel (8%).  Shares of the company were listed on the Luxembourg Stock Exchange, of which it was one of the ten (and one of the seven Luxembourg-based) members of the main index, the LuxX Index

As a result of the European Union policy of liberalization of the energy market, Enovos Gruppe  acquired Cegedel SA along with Soteg SA, the gas distributor, in 2009, and created a Luxembourg subsidiary, Creos Luxembourg to distribute both gas and electricity.

Footnotes

External links
 Creos Luxembourg SA, distributor, official website
 Enovos Luxembourg SA, generator and supplier, official web site
 Enovos International SA, the parent corporation

Electric power companies of Luxembourg
Energy companies established in 1928
Strassen, Luxembourg
1928 establishments in Luxembourg